Campmor is an outdoor recreation equipment retailer established in Bogota, New Jersey in 1978.  The company sells outdoor camping gear and camping equipment.  Campmor's warehousing and order processing facilities are located in Paramus, New Jersey.

History
Campmor started in a New Jersey garage in 1978.  In its early years, the company was primarily a mail-order company with one retail store in Paramus, New Jersey. The company then evolved to a largely online model, launching its ecommerce site in 1998.  The company states that approximately 75% of its business comes from its website, 5% from catalogs and mail order, and the remaining 20% from its Paramus store.

Corporate information

References

External links 
 Campmor official site

Camping equipment manufacturers
Outdoor clothing brands
Sporting goods retailers of the United States
Privately held companies of the United States
Clothing retailers of the United States
Companies based in New Jersey
American companies established in 1978
Retail companies established in 1978
Mail-order retailers
Online retailers of the United States
1978 establishments in New Jersey